The Bayer designation Iota Cygni (ι Cyg / ι Cygni) is shared by two stars, in the constellation Cygnus:
ι¹ Cygni, dimmer (magnitude 5.75)
ι² Cygni, brighter (magnitude 3.77), often simply called ι Cyg

References

Cygni, Iota
Cygnus (constellation)